The Farm Creek Section, also known as the Farmdale Geologic Exposure, is a hillside near East Peoria, Illinois that clearly showed geological strata.  It is nationally significant as one of the first exposed glacial stratifications in the United States to be scientifically documented.  These Ice Age geological formations, with rock layers representing different periods of glaciation, had long been known and published in England, France, and Germany, but were not yet well known in North America.  Geologist Frank Leverett discovered this exposed face of a hill with its clearly defined stratifications in 1879 and described and pictured it in his monograph, The Illinois Glacial Lobe, in 1899.

The Farm Creek publication gave a name to the Illinoian glaciation, the southernmost penetration of glacial ice into what was to become the Midwestern United States.  It also helped formulate regional and national stratigraphic classifications and has figured prominently in the study and development of glacial geology.

A   area of the Farm Creek Section was declared a National Historic Landmark in 1997.

The site is on the south side of Farm Creek (a tributary of the Illinois River) in the Farm Creek Recreation Area, south of Illinois Route 8 (Washington St.) and between School Street and Bittersweet Road, and is accessible by following an unpaved road, part of which is an abandoned right of way formerly in use by the Toledo, Peoria and Western Railroad.  The formation is largely covered by a modern soil layer.  Some erosion has occurred in the time since its initial discovery, but the layers of strata are still readily discernible.

See also

List of National Historic Landmarks in Illinois
National Register of Historic Places listings in Tazewell County, Illinois

References

Landforms of Illinois
Geography of Tazewell County, Illinois
Pleistocene geology
Quaternary United States
Stratigraphy of Illinois
Natural features on the National Register of Historic Places
National Historic Landmarks in Illinois
1879 in science
1879 in Illinois
National Register of Historic Places in Tazewell County, Illinois